Lepidophora lutea is a species of bee fly in the family Bombyliidae.

References

External links

 

Bombyliidae
Articles created by Qbugbot
Insects described in 1962